Parvaneh may refer to:
 Parvaneh, Isfahan
 Parvaneh, West Azerbaijan
 Parvaneh (film), a 2012 Swiss short film
 Khatereh Parvaneh (1930-2008), Iranian singer
 Parvaneh Pourshariati, historian